Hato Corozal Airport  is an airport serving the town of Hato Corozal, in the Casanare Department of Colombia.

The runway is on the southeast side of the town, and has an additional  of grass overrun on the southwest end.

See also

Transport in Colombia
List of airports in Colombia

References

External links
OpenStreetMap - Hato Corozal
OurAirports - Hato Corozal
FallingRain - Hato Corozal

Airports in Colombia